Ordobrevia flavolineata, is a species of riffle beetle found in Sri Lanka.

Adults beetles are found on the stones on cascade, and stones on shore.

References 

Elmidae
Insects of Sri Lanka
Insects described in 1973